Joseph Massie may refer to:

 Joseph Massie (American football) (1871–1922), American football player and coach
 Joseph Massie (economist) (died 1784), British political economist
 Joseph Hardin Massie, architect of Edgewood, 1858 (Amherst, Virginia)

See also
 Joseph Massey (disambiguation)